"You're All Woman" is a song by Australian band Sherbet. It was released in June 1972 as the third single from Sherbet's debut studio album Time Change... A Natural Progression. The single reached at number 19 on the Kent Music Report and it also reached at number 13 on Go-Set.

Track listing

Charts

Personnel 
 Alan Sandow – drums, percussion, bongoes, chimes
 Daryl Braithwaite – lead vocals, tambourine, tabla 
 Clive Shakespeare – guitar, vocals 
 Garth Porter – keyboards, clavinet, piano, lead vocals, backing vocals, Hammond organ, electric piano, synthesiser
 Producer - Richard Batchens (tracks: 2)

References 

Sherbet (band) songs
1972 singles
1972 songs
Festival Records singles
Infinity Records singles
Songs written by Ted Mulry